Qingshuihe explosion (清水河大爆炸) is a chemical explosion occurred in Qingshuihe Subdistrict, Luohu District, Shenzhen City, Guangdong Province, People's Republic of China on August 5, 1993. It's the second largest chemical explosion accident since the end of World War II.

Incident
The first explosion occurred from an ammonium nitrate warehouse at 13:30, August 5, 1993 and it finally became a big fire. Even people in Lok Ma Chau, Hong Kong were able to see the smoke.

References

External links
Video of Shenzhen's Qingshuihe Chemical Warehouse Explosion (YouTube)

1993 fires in Asia
1993 disasters in China
Industrial fires and explosions in China
History of Guangdong